The Faculty of History at the University of Cambridge is among the largest and most prestigious history faculties in the world. Though the study of history at Cambridge dates back centuries, the study of history as a distinct academic discipline in the form of the undergraduate Historical Tripos was only established in the nineteenth century: history had previously been studied as part of the broader 'Moral Sciences' Tripos, and subsequently within the 'Law and History' Tripos. Nevertheless, the Historical Tripos - together with the Master of Philosophy (MPhil) and Doctor of Philosophy (PhD) degrees offered by the Faculty - has produced a large number of alumni who have gone onto occupy a broad range of positions in public life. 

The alumni listed on this page have read either Parts I or II, or both parts, of the Historical Tripos. Only a small number of those listed here have only undertaken graduate studies in History at Cambridge, as many of the notable alumni of the Faculty's graduate programmes are professional academics rather than public figures in other fields. Given the sheer volume of professional academics produced by the Faculty, it would be impractical to list them all here. 

This following list is not exhaustive and is far from complete. A large potential source for expansion of this list would be those of Ambassadorial rank within Her Majesty's Diplomatic Service and senior members of Her Majesty's Home Civil Service over the past century.

Royalty

King Charles III
King Edward VII
King George VI
Prince Edward, Earl of Wessex
George Windsor, Earl of St Andrews
Prince Zeid Raad Al Hussein
Prince William of Gloucester
Frederick Duleep Singh

Religion

Justin Welby, Archbishop of Canterbury 
Richard Chartres, Baron Chartres, Bishop of London
Matthew Festing, Prince and Grand Master of the Sovereign Military Order of Malta
David Hoyle, Dean of Westminster
Mark Langham, Administrator of Westminster Cathedral and Cambridge University Catholic Chaplain
John Mort, Bishop of Northern Nigeria
Nick Papadopulos, Dean of Salisbury
Simon Phipps, Bishop of Lincoln
Barry Till

Politics

Diane Abbott
Tunku Abdul Rahman, Malaysian Prime Minister
Stanley Baldwin, British Prime Minister, Chancellor of the University of Cambridge 
Steve Barclay
Simon Baynes
John Biffen, Baron Biffen
Mark Malloch Brown, Baron Malloch-Brown
Rab Butler
Erskine Hamilton Childers, Irish President
Alistair Cooke, Baron Lexden
Tam Dalyell
Adam Fergusson
Geoffrey Filkin, Baron Filkin
Kate Forbes
Euan Geddes, 3rd Baron Geddes
Maurice Glasman, Baron Glasman
Julia Goldsworthy
Chris Grayling
Stephen Greenhalgh, Baron Greenhalgh
Nick Griffin
Ben Gummer
John Gummer, Baron Deben
Peter Hennessy
Jonathan Hill, Baron Hill of Oareford
Alan Howarth, Baron Howarth of Newport
Tristram Hunt
Baron Hurd of Westwell
Robert Jenrick
Liz Kendall
Kwasi Kwarteng
Oliver Letwin
David Lidington
Iain Macleod
Julie Marson
Francis Maude, Baron Maude of Horsham
Andrew Mitchell
Stephen Parkinson, Baron Parkinson of Whitley Bay
Owen Paterson
Michael Portillo
Peter Shore
Wes Streeting
Peter Viggers
Alan Watson, Baron Watson of Richmond (High Steward of the University of Cambridge)
William Whitelaw
Michael Wills
Laura Wyld, Baroness Wyld
Tim Yeo
Daniel Zeichner

Government service

Michael Axworthy
Andrew Bailey (banker), Governor of the Bank of England
Guy Burgess, British Diplomat and Soviet Spy, member of the Cambridge Five
Sean Cairncross, Chief Executive of the Millennium Challenge Corporation and former senior Presidential advisor 
Hugh Carless
Simon Case, Cabinet Secretary and Head of the Home Civil Service
Major General Sir Duncan Cumming
Sir Christopher Curwen, Chief of the Secret Intelligence Service
Sir Richard Dearlove, Chief of the Secret Intelligence Service
Mark Evelyn Heath
Frances Hermia Durham, civil servant
Sir Ronald Garvey
Sir John Jones, Director General of MI5
George Jellicoe, 2nd Earl Jellicoe
Helen MacNamara
Ian Martin (UN official)
Sir Christopher Mallaby, British Ambassador to France, and to Germany
Richard Mayne
Damian McBride, Downing Street Press Secretary
Sir Simon McDonald, Foreign Office Permanent Secretary
Sir Christopher Meyer, British Ambassador to the United States, and to Germany
Kim Philby, British Diplomat and Soviet Spy, member of the Cambridge Five
Sir David Reddaway, British High Commissioner to Canada, to Ireland, and to Turkey
Robin Renwick, Baron Renwick of Clifton, British Ambassador to the United States, and to South Africa
Dame Ruth Runciman
Sir Philip Rutnam, Home Office and Department for Transport Permanent Secretary
Sir Tom Scholar, Treasury Permanent Secretary
Herbert Simmonds
Adair Turner, Baron Turner of Ecchinswell
Sir David Wright, British Ambassador to Japan
Arthur Ferdinand Yencken

Law

Norman Birkett, 1st Baron Birkett
Sir Terence Etherton, Master of the Rolls and Head of Civil Justice
Sir Llewelyn Dalton
Sir Robert Yewdall Jennings, President of the International Court of Justice
Igor Judge, Baron Judge, Lord Chief Justice of England and Wales
Elwyn Jones, Baron Elwyn-Jones
Dame Christina Lambert 
Sir Elihu Lauterpacht
Anthony Lester, Baron Lester of Herne Hill
Sir Louis Mbanefo
Martha Spurrier, barrister and Director of Liberty
Sir Nicholas Stadlen
Sydney Templeman, Baron Templeman

Business

George Chubb, 3rd Baron Hayter
Dame Julia Cleverdon
Gerald Corbett
Sir Michael Marshall
Sir Douglas Myers
Sir Evelyn de Rothschild
David Thomson, 3rd Baron Thomson of Fleet 
Christopher Tugendhat, Baron Tugendhat
Jasper Parrott
Rose Paterson
John Vincent

Media

Sacha Baron Cohen
Cecil Beaton
Louise Brealey
David Mitchell
Joe Thomas
Jonathan Routh

Sports

Bunny Austin
Michael Atherton
Alistair Hignell
Tony Lewis
George Mallory
Michael Packe

Journalism

Bruce Anderson
Neal Ascherson
Joan Bakewell, Baroness Bakewell
Christopher Booker
Larry Elliott
Andrew Gilligan
Simon Heffer
Peter Jenkins
Robert Lacey
Christopher Martin-Jenkins
Allan Massie
Richard Mayne
Charles Moore
Peter Oborne
Andrew Rawnsley
John Rentoul
Jenni Russell
Stephen Sackur
Charles Wintour

Authors

Sir Philip Augar
Ferenc Békássy
Alain de Botton
David Brading
Piers Brendon
Hugh Brogan
Louise Dean
Christopher Frayling
Donald James
Lionel Charles Knights
Eric Midwinter
Carl Miller
Michael Oakeshott
Piers Paul Read
John Press
Peter Pugh
Gillian Riley
Sir Salman Rushdie
Siegfried Sassoon
Tom Sharpe
Tim Stanley
Bee Wilson
Louisa Young

Arts

Michael Apted
Robin Ellis
William George Constable
Arnold Cooke
Sir Derek Jacobi
Jonathan Jones
Legson Kayira
Tony Palmer
Stephen Poliakoff
Wilfrid Scott-Giles
Amy Shindler
Andrew Sinclair 
John Tusa

University management

Noel Annan, Provost of King's College, Cambridge and Provost of University College London
Dame Madeleine Atkins, Vice Chancellor of Coventry University and President of Lucy Cavendish College, Cambridge
Matthew Bullock, Master of St Edmund's College, Cambridge
Mark Damazer, Master of St Peter's College, Oxford
Tim Luckhurst, Principal of South College, Durham
Alison Rose, Principal of Newnham College, Cambridge
David Sainsbury, Baron Sainsbury of Turville, Chancellor of the University of Cambridge
Arthur Tedder, 1st Baron Tedder, Chancellor of the University of Cambridge 
David Watson, Vice Chancellor of the University of Brighton
David Williams, Vice-Chancellor of the University of Cambridge and President of Wolfson College, Cambridge

Education

Katherine Laird Cox
Bernard Orchard
Roger Wickson

References

Alumni of the University of Cambridge